David Mattingley, DFC (14 June 1922 – 2 June 2017) was an Australian bomber pilot who flew for the Royal Australian Air Force in the British No. 625 Squadron during World War II in which he received the Distinguished Flying Cross.

Biography
David Mattingley was born in Tasmania, 1922. At age 19 he was accepted into the Royal Australian Air Force. Because of the high casualty rate in Bomber Command, he underwent training on heavy aircraft. He was then posted to RAF 625 Squadron at Kelstern, Lincolnshire.

Distinguished Flying Cross
On his 23rd operation on November 29, 1944, Mattingley and his crew took off in Lancaster D DOG for a daytime raid on Dortmund as part of a force of some 300 aircraft.

After bombing the target successfully they turned for home and met very intensive flak. Although Mattingley was hit in the head by shrapnel which fractured his skull and severed tendons in his right hand, he continued to fly on. A little later flak caught them twice more and he was wounded in the right knee and later in the right shoulder, rendering his arm useless.

Eventually, having crossed the coast, he offered the crew the chance to bail out over England. They refused, so he called base to have fire engines and an ambulance ready for their landing. He did not mention they were required for him. With some assistance on the throttles from his English flight engineer, Cyril Bailey, he put the severely damaged aircraft down in a copybook landing. He received an immediate award of the DFC, and Cyril, who was also wounded, received the DFM.

He was honoured in The London Gazette on 26 January 1945:

Recovery
Mattingley spent the next four months in Rauceby Hospital and Loughborough.

In September 1945 while awaiting repatriation he was diagnosed with severe pleurisy which developed into Tuberculosis, hospitalising him for a further five months before being returned by hospital ship to Australia, where he had three more hospital stays. Altogether he had spent three years in hospital as a result of his wartime experiences.

Personal life
After the war Mattingley taught at one of Adelaide's exclusive boys' schools, Prince Alfred College. He married the now Christobel Mattingley who published his experiences in Battle Order 204, bore three children, two sons and a daughter.

References

Australian recipients of the Distinguished Flying Cross (United Kingdom)
Australian World War II pilots
1922 births
2017 deaths
People from Tasmania
Australian schoolteachers